The Edmonton Rush are a lacrosse team based in Edmonton playing in the National Lacrosse League (NLL). The 2014 season is the 9th in franchise history. The Rush began the season with an NLL record 14 straight victories, clinching the western division title and the best record in the league before they lost their first game, a 10-8 decision to the Colorado Mammoth on April 11.

Regular season

Current standings

Game log

Regular season
Reference:

Playoffs

Transactions

Trades

*Later traded back to the Edmonton Rush

Entry Draft
The 2013 NLL Entry Draft took place on September 16, 2013. The Rush made the following selections:

 Denotes player who never played in the NLL regular season or playoffs

Roster

See also
2014 NLL season

References

2014 in lacrosse
Edmonton Rush seasons
Edmonton Rush